Elvis Alfonso Martínez Dugarte (born 4 October 1970 in Mérida) is a Venezuelan football manager and former player who played as a defender. He is the current manager of Deportivo Rayo Zuliano.

Martínez made a total number of 33 appearances for the Venezuela national team between 1993 and 2002. He started his professional career at Universidad Los Andes.

References

External links

1970 births
Living people
Venezuelan footballers
Venezuela international footballers
Association football defenders
Caracas FC players
Deportivo Táchira F.C. players
Estudiantes de Mérida players
UA Maracaibo players
1991 Copa América players
1995 Copa América players
1997 Copa América players
2001 Copa América players
Celta de Vigo B players
Segunda División B players
Venezuelan expatriate footballers
Venezuelan expatriate sportspeople in Spain
Expatriate footballers in Spain
Venezuelan football managers
People from Mérida, Mérida
Venezuelan Segunda División managers